Children of Hannibal is a 1998 Italian comedy film written and directed by Davide Ferrario.

Cast   
 Diego Abatantuono as  Tommaso
 Silvio Orlando as Domenico
 Valentina Cervi as  Rita
 Flavio Insinna as  Orfeo
  Ugo Conti as  Ermes
  Elena Giove as Carmela 
 Pietro Ghislandi as Bank Clerk
 Caterina Sylos Labini as Private Policewoman

References

External links

1998 comedy films
1998 films
Italian comedy films
Films directed by Davide Ferrario
1990s Italian-language films
1990s Italian films